Jadwiga of Kalisz (Polish: Jadwiga kaliska (Bolesławówna); 1266 – 10 December 1339) was a Queen of Poland by marriage to Ladislaus the Short. She was the mother of the last Piast King of Poland, Casimir III.

She was the second of three daughters born to Bolesław the Pious and Saint Yolanda of Hungary. In 1293, Jadwiga married Ladislaus I of Poland.

Life
Jadwiga's husband, Ladislaus (Polish: Władysław, known as the "Short" and the "Elbow-high"), was a bitter rival of Wenceslaus II of Bohemia who was King of Poland between 1291–1305. Life was dangerous for Jadwiga and her family during this time, she and three of her children had to go into hiding for a while in 1300. In 1305, Wenceslaus II died and was succeeded by his son, Wenceslaus III of Bohemia. Wenceslaus III reigned for a year before he was assassinated by Germans under mysterious circumstances so his campaign of Poland ended. His wife, Viola of Teschen, had not borne him any children, so Ladislaus assumed control in Poland.

In 1318, Ladislaus began making attempts to have himself crowned king. The pope, John XXII, though initially unwilling, finally granted his approval and Ladislaus and Jadwiga were crowned King and Queen of Poland on 30 January 1320 in Kraków; a new crown was made for the new queen and it was later used to crown other queens of Poland. The coronation was a sign that he had overcome Poland's internal fragmentation and re-united and re-instated the country as an independent kingdom under his rule. Poland now needed friends abroad; so in 1320, Jadwiga and Władysław's daughter Elizabeth (1305–1380) married Charles I of Hungary. Jadwiga played an active part in politics during her husband's reign.

Her husband died in 1333. Jadwiga lived until 1339.

Issue
In addition to Elizabeth, Ladislaus and Jadwiga had:
Elizabeth (1305–1380) married Charles I of Hungary
Stephen (d. 1306)
Władysław (d. 1311/1312)
Kunigunde (c. 1298-1331)
Casimir III the Great (1310–1370)
Jadwiga (d. 1320/1322).  Queen Jadwiga assumed the regency of Stary Sącz in 1334 when Constance of Świdnica, her granddaughter by Kunigunde, resigned to become a nun.

In popular culture

Film 
Jadwiga of Kalisz is a primary character in the first season of the Polish historical drama Korona królów ("The Crown of the Kings").

Ancestors

References

Sources

|-

Piast dynasty
1266 births
1339 deaths
13th-century Polish women
14th-century Polish nuns
Polish queens consort
13th-century Polish people
14th-century Polish people
Queen mothers